The American College of Osteopathic Emergency Physicians (ACOEP) is a professional organization of emergency medicine physicians. It was founded in 1975. Active membership is open only to osteopathic (D.O.) medical physicians who have practiced emergency medicine for the past three years and/or have completed an emergency medicine residency approved by the American Osteopathic Association (AOA) or Accreditation Council for Graduate Medical Education (ACGME). Fellows use the designation FACOEP. As of November 2017, ACOEP had over 5,000 members.

See also
 American Osteopathic Board of Emergency Medicine

References

External links
 ACOEP homepage

Emergency medicine education
Osteopathic medical associations in the United States
Organizations established in 1975
Medical and health professional associations in Chicago